Vladimir Aleksandrovich Usov (1957 – 2006), known as The Boy Hunter, was a Soviet serial killer who raped and killed five little boys. One of the youngest serial killers in history (he committed his first murder at 17 years of age), he was declared insane and spent 30 years in psychiatric hospitals.

Biography 
Usov grew up in a drinking family. From the 5th grade, he dropped out of school unexpectedly, claiming that he had heard some voices that told him not to go to school. His parents took him to a psychiatrist, who diagnosed him with paranoid schizophrenia. Thus, at the age of 14, Usov received two disability groups and a small pension.

At the age of 17, the voices began to call for Usov to perform acts of a pederastic nature. The first murder he committed occurred in Kuybyshev on August 1, 1974, when an 8-year-old boy named Boris, who had been missing since July 30, was killed. On that day, the boy was playing in the courtyard of his house when a man in a sports suit came up to him and suggested going to a nearby forest to collect nuts. No one else saw the boy after that. This was the coroner's report:After that, Usov killed four more boys. After the murder of 7-year-old Valery in Tolyatti, a witness reported seeing suspicious people who made strange signs to each other. Rehearsing this version, the senior inspector of the Criminal Investigation, Gronid Simakov, entered the company of several homosexual people. The murder of two of the victims was initially attributed to the physics teacher Petr Popov. He willingly took the blame, wishing to die, because during the investigation his sexuality was revealed, writing a death letter and twice trying to hang himself in his cell. While studying Popov's testimony, Simakov realized that the suspect was innocent, and informed the authorities about this. Employees of the criminal investigation department had already reported to Moscow about "exposing" Popov and began to pressure Simakov, threatening him with court, and he was removed from office. However, Simakov stood his ground, and it was impossible to condemn the innocent Popov.

The last murder Usov committed was on June 17, 1975, in the Goreliy Khutor village. After raping and strangling a child, he collected a heap of dry brushwood, flunked the boy's body with it and set it on fire. He was arrested soon after.

On June 1, 1977, the Kuybyshev Regional Court ruled that Vladimir Usov be sent to compulsory treatment in a psychiatric clinic. For 18 years he was kept in a specialized clinic in Kazan, and then transferred to a clinic in Samara, where he managed to escape from in 1996. He kidnapped two boys whom he was going to kill, but was too afraid. The next day he was captured and sent to the Kazan clinic for especially dangerous insane people, where he died in 2006.

In the media 
 Documentary film from the series "The investigation was conducted..", titled "Psycho"

See also
 List of Russian serial killers

References

External links 
 "The investigation was conducted... - Psycho"

1957 births
2006 deaths
Male serial killers
Murder committed by minors
People acquitted by reason of insanity
Russian murderers of children
Russian rapists
Russian serial killers
Soviet murderers of children
Soviet rapists
Soviet serial killers
Violence against men in Europe